The Conference Basketball League (CBL) was a second-tiered men's semi-professional basketball league in New Zealand. During the 1980s and 1990s, the CBL served as a means of promotion and relegation between the National Basketball League (NBL). By the 2000s, it served as a means for associations to enter representative teams into a national division two competition. The CBL also served as a feeder league for development or academy squads of NBL teams.

History
The Conference Basketball League (CBL) ran every year between 1981 and 2008, and consisted of multiple conferences throughout its lifetime, including northern, capital, central, and southern. From seven teams in 1996, the CBL grew to 25 teams spread over four conferences in 1999. The challenges facing the league by the late 2000s were similar to the national women's league, namely finding a format that teams could economically support. Basketball New Zealand chose not to host the CBL in 2009, before bringing it back in a one-off, five-day tournament in 2010.

League results

CBL Zone 1
In 2009, North Harbour Basketball Association took on the responsibility of hosting the Conference Basketball League in the Auckland Region. The competition was predominantly run in the North Harbour area and was a zone 1 competition. The league was rebranded as the Supercity Basketball Competition in 2010, and then as the Senior Intercity Competition in 2011 and 2012, although it was still colloquially known during this time as the Conference Basketball League.

Results

References

External links 
 CBL @ Basketball.org.nz 2000 2001 2002 2003 2004 2005 2006 2007
 CBL 1999
 CBL 2001
 CBL finals 2001
 2001 CBL finals review
 2002 CBL finals review
 CBL 2008 (page 10)
 CBL 2009
 CBL 2010

Basketball leagues in New Zealand
Sports leagues established in 1981
1981 establishments in New Zealand